The Movement for the Salvation of Azawad (abbreviated MSA) is a Tuareg political movement and armed group in Azawad, Mali. It was founded on 2 September 2016 by Moussa Ag Acharatoumane.

History 
The MSA was founded on 2 September 2016 in Tin-Fadimata, north of Ménaka, by former members of the National Movement for the Liberation of Azawad (MNLA).

With French support, a joint-operation was conducted by the MSA and the Imghad Tuareg Self-Defense Group and Allies (or GATIA) on 23 February 2018 to capture or kill Malian ISIL commander Abu Walid al-Sahrawi. Six ISIL militants were killed in the ensuing clashes, but Sahrawi evaded capture.

MSA and GATIA troops battled ISIL militants from 2 to 5 June 2018. ISIL commanders Almahmoud Ag Akawkaw was captured, while Amat Ag Assalate was killed during the battle.

References 

Azawad
Organizations established in 2016
Political movements in Mali
Rebel groups in Mali